David Pratt  (5 March 1896 – 28 July 1967) was a Scottish football player and manager. His career encompassed time spent in both England and Scotland, as well as a spell in Wales.

As a player, he was used both as a defender and as a midfielder on the outside left. He started his career at Celtic in 1919, before moving to England two years later to play for Bradford City. In 1923 he moved on to Liverpool, where he would remain for the next four years. He then ended his playing career after spells with Bury and Yeovil Town.

He got his break in management with Yeovil Town in 1929, before he was installed as Clapton Orient manager in 1933. His reign was to only last one year, and he spent a spell in 1935 as Notts County manager, before he returned to Scotland later in the year to manage Heart of Midlothian. He left Hearts in 1937 and was appointed manager at Bangor City, though he lost his position before the end of the year. His final role was as Port Vale between 1944 and 1945, though he never actually took a charge of a game for the "Valiants".

Playing career
Pratt began his playing career during the last years of World War I with a series of local Fife sides, namely Lochore Welfare, Lochgelly United and Hearts of Beath. He joined Celtic from the latter in June 1919 and made his debut several months later, in a home game with Falkirk. His versatility counted against him though and he never developed into a first team regular at Celtic Park. Indeed, although later primarily considered a defender, the position he appeared in most frequently for Celtic was outside left.

In 1921 Pratt moved south, joining Bradford City, where his consistent performances earned him a move to Liverpool two years later. He spent four seasons on Merseyside but as with his time at Celtic, he was unable to attain a regular first team berth. His most consistent run in the first team occurred in 1924–25, while his only goal for the club was recorded during a 6–3 defeat of Newcastle United the following season. He joined Bury in 1927 before moving further south to Yeovil Town.

Managerial career
Pratt eventually became manager of Yeovil, before assuming control of Yeovil & Petters United in 1929. This was to be his longest period in charge of one club, the rest of his coaching career characterised by short tenures in managerial positions. Between May and December 1933 he managed Clapton Orient, then he had two months in charge of Notts County in spring 1935. He then returned to Scotland where he replaced Willie McCartney as Heart of Midlothian manager. He lasted two seasons in Edinburgh before moving to Wales with Bangor City, where he stayed until the outbreak of World War II. He served in the RAF during the conflict before taking his final managerial role, with Port Vale, in December 1944, a position he vacated six months later. He failed to gain a release from the Air Force and so never managed to be a manager to the Vale other than in name only.

Career statistics

Playing statistics
Source:

Managerial statistics

References

Footballers from Fife
Scottish footballers
Association football defenders
Association football outside forwards
Celtic F.C. players
Bradford City A.F.C. players
Liverpool F.C. players
Bury F.C. players
Yeovil Town F.C. players
Royal Air Force personnel of World War II
Association football player-managers
Scottish football managers
Yeovil Town F.C. managers
Clapton Orient F.C. managers
Notts County F.C. managers
Heart of Midlothian F.C. managers
Bangor City F.C. managers
Port Vale F.C. managers
English Football League players
Scottish Football League players
English Football League managers
Scottish Football League managers
1896 births
1967 deaths
Lochore Welfare F.C. players
Lochgelly United F.C. players
Hearts of Beath F.C. players